One of the Guys may refer to:

Film and television
One of the Guys (film), a 2018 Canadian documentary film
One of the Guys, a 1998 TV movie in the Billy the Cat series
"One of the Guys", a 1999 episode of Pepper Ann
"One of the Guys", a 2003 episode of Lizzie McGuire

Music
"One of the Guys", a song by Kellie Pickler from the 2006 album Small Town Girl
"One of the Guys", a 1967 song by MC5
"One of the Guys", a song by Terri Clark on the 2004 album Greatest Hits 1994–2004
"One of the Guys", a song from the 2001 musical Peggy Sue Got Married

Other uses
One of the Guys: Girls, Gangs and Gender, a 2001 non-fiction book by criminologist Jody Miller
One of the Guys, a 1988 book by Harry Stein

See also
One of the Boys (disambiguation)
Just One of the Guys, a 1985 film